Jean-Marie Bonal (born Saint-Cirgues-de-Jordanne, 31 May 1943) is a French former rugby union and rugby league footballer who played in the 1960s and 1970s. He played rugby union as a wing. He is the brother of French rugby league former international Élie Bonal and of former rugby union player Patrick Bonal, as well the uncle of the former rugby union players Sébastien Viars and Jean-François Viars.

He played rugby union for Stade Toulousain. 

He had 14 caps for France, from 1968 to 1970, scoring 5 tries, 15 points on aggregate. He played at the Five Nations Championship, in 1968, 1969 and 1970. He had 9 caps, scoring 3 tries, 9 points on aggregate. He won the competition in 1968 with a Grand Slam.

He played rugby league for AS Carcassonne. He also played for France national rugby league team.

References

External links
Jean-Marie Bonal International Statistics

1943 births
Living people
AS Carcassonne players
France national rugby league team players
French rugby league players
French rugby union players
Rugby union wings
Stade Toulousain players
France international rugby union players
Sportspeople from Cantal